This is the list of programs that broadcast on Jack TV, a Filipino cable and satellite television network owned by Solar Entertainment Corporation.

Final Broadcast on Jack TV

U.S. TV Series

Sitcom
 The Big Bang Theory
 Brooklyn Nine-Nine
 I Live with Models
 It's Always Sunny in Philadelphia
 The Last Man on Earth
 People of Earth
 Superstore
 You're the Worst

Science Fiction, Superhero, Horror, Action and Drama Series
 The 100 
 American Crime Story 
 American Horror Story 
 Arrow
 Bates Motel
 Chicago Fire
 Elementary 
 Empire
 The Flash
 Gotham
 Legends of Tomorrow
 Mr. Robot
 NCIS
 Suits
 Supergirl
 Z Nation

Variety/Sketch/Musical
 Rebel Music
 Saturday Night Live

Reality/Game Shows
 Brew Dogs 
 Best Bars in America
 Car Matchmaker
 Cosplay Melee
 Drop the Mic
 Hip Hop Squares
 Penn & Teller: Fool Us
 Sisterhood of Hip Hop
 Skin Wars
 Spartan: Ultimate Team Challenge
 So You Think You Can Dance
 Survivor (U.S.)
 Tattoos After Dark
 Undercover Boss

Documentary
 Autopsy: The Last Hours of...
 Killerpost
 Who Do You Think You Are?

Entertainment News
 TMZ

Talk Shows
 Inside the Actors Studio
 The Tonight Show Starring Jimmy Fallon

Local Programs

Infotainment Programs
 The Big Thing
 Hype
 Off The Wall

Special Features
 Jack TV Preview
 Jack TV Playlist

Previously broadcast on Jack TV

International programs

0-9
 $25 Million Dollar Hoax
 $#*! My Dad Says
 24
 30 Rock
 666 Park Avenue

A
 About a Boy
 Aliens in America
 Allen Gregory
 Alphas
 American Dad!
 American Gladiators
 America's Best Dance Crew
 Andy Barker, P. I.
 Arrested Development
The Art Of 
 The Avengers

B
 Baby Looney Tunes
 Back to You
 Banzai
 The Batman
 Batman Beyond
 Battleground
 Beast Wars: Transformers
 Beat the Geeks
 Beat TV
 Beauty and the Geek 
 Best Ink
 Being Human
 Ben 10
 Billy & Billie
 Blue Collar TV
 Bob's Burgers
 Bones
 Brainiac: Science Abuse
 Brand X with Russell Brand
 Brickleberry
 Burn Notice

C
 Camp Lazlo
 Chappelle's Show
 Cheat!
 Chelsea Lately
 The Chicago Code
 Chozen
 Chowder
 Chuck
 Cinematech
 Clipped
 The Cleveland Show
 The Comedians
 Comedy Central Presents
 Comedy Inc.
 Conan
 Constantine
 Cooper Barrett's Guide to Surviving Life
 Crank Yankers

D
 The Daily Show with Jon Stewart
 A Day in the Life
 Damien 
 Defiance 
 Defying Gravity
 Distraction UK
 Doogie Howser, M.D.
 Dr. Katz
 Drawn Together

E
 The Event
 Everybody Hates Chris

F
 Family Guy
 FilmFakers
 Foster's Home for Imaginary Friends
 Futurama

G
 Glee
 The Glee Project
 Grimm
 Ground Floor

H
 Heavy Gear
 Heroes of Cosplay
 Heroes Reborn
 HitRecord on TV
 House

I
 I Just Want My Pants Back 
 The Incredible Hulk
 Insomniac with Dave Attell

J
 Jackie Chan Adventures
 The Jamie Kennedy Experiment
 The Jay Leno Show
 The Joe Schmo Show 
 Just For Laughs Gags
 Just for Variety
 Just Kidding
 Justice League
 Justice League Unlimited

K
 Kelsey Grammer Presents: The Sketch Show
 Kid Notorious
 The Killing
 King of the Hill

L
 Last Comic Standing
 Late Night with Conan O'Brien
 Late Night with Jimmy Fallon
 Late Show with David Letterman
 Legion of Super Heroes
 Legit
 Lie to Me
 Live from Abbey Road
 Loonatics Unleashed
 The Loop
 Louie
 Lucifer

M
 Mad
 MADtv
 Making History
 Malcolm in the Middle
 Man Seeking Woman
 The Man Show
 Man vs. Cartoon
 Max Steel
 Megas XLR
 Merlin
 The Messengers
 Me, Myself & I
 The Middle
 Minority Report
 Motormouth
 Mulaney
 My Gym Partner's a Monkey
 My Name is Earl

N
 Napoleon Dynamite

O
 The Odd Couple
 The Office (U.S.)

P
 Parks and Recreation
 Partners
 Powerless 
 Person of Interest 
 The Powerpuff Girls
 Premium Blend
 Primetime Glick
 Psych
 Pushing Daisies
 Pussycat Dolls Present: Girlicious
 Pussycat Dolls Present: The Search for the Next Doll

R
 Raising Hope
 The Real Gilligan's Island
 Ren & Stimpy "Adult Party Cartoon"
 Reno 911!
 Revolution
 Ride with Funkmaster Flex
 Rob Dyrdek's Fantasy Factory
 Royal Pains

S
 Salem 
 Samurai Jack
 Scare Tactics
 Sex & Drugs & Rock & Roll 
 Shorties Watching Shorties
 Sirens
 Small Wonder
 Snoop Dogg's Fatherhood
 Sons of Anarchy
 South Park
 Spider-Man and His Amazing Friends
 Still Standing
 Straight Plan for the Gay Man
Street Art Throwdown
 Street Smarts
 Stripperella
 Surviving Jack

T
 Terra Nova
 That '70s Show
 That's My Bush
 Time After Time

 Tommy Lee Goes to College
 The Cleveland Show
 The Simpsons
 The Tomorrow People
 The Tonight Show with Conan O'Brien
 The Tonight Show with Jay Leno
 Touch
 Trigger Happy TV
 Two and a Half Men

U
 Undateable 
 Unsupervised

W
 The War at Home
 The Wonder Years
 Web Soup
 Weekends at the DL
 White Collar
 Who Wants to be a Millionaire?
 Who Wants to be a Superhero?
 Wilfred
 Worst Case Scenario

X
 X-Men
 X-Men: Evolution
 X-Play

Y
 You, Me and the Apocalypse

WWE programs
 ECW
 WWE
 WWE Afterburn
 WWE Bottom Line
 WWE Experience
 WWE Heat
 WWE NXT
 WWE Pay-Per-View
 WWE Raw
 WWE SmackDown
 WWE Velocity
 WWE Vintage Collection

Movie and specials block
 Jack In The Box
 Jack TV Handpicked
 Jack Peep' Choice
 Jack's Booth JackYardInformative
 The Peep ShowInformercials
 Shop TVSports Coverage
 2005 Manila SEA Games Coverage  
 2008 Beijing Olympic Games Coverage 
 WWE Bragging Rights (2009–2010)
 WWE Elimination Chamber (2010–2012)
 WWE Extreme Rules (2010–2011)
 WWE Hell in a Cell (2009–2011)
 WWE Money in the Bank (2010–2011)
 WWE Night of Champions (2008–2011)
 WWE NXT Grand Finals (2010–2011)
 WWE Over the Limit (2010–2011)
 WWE Royal Rumble (2005–2012)
 WWE SummerSlam (2006–2011)
 WWE Survivor Series (2005–2011)
 WWE TLC: Tables, Ladders & Chairs (2009–2011)
 WWE Vengeance (2005–2007, 2011)
 WWE Wrestlemania (2005–2011)

TV specials
 Miss Universe 2016 (January 30, 2017)
 59th Annual Grammy Awards (February 13, 2017)
 60th Annual Grammy Awards (January 29, 2018)
 61st Annual Grammy Awards'' (February 11, 2019)

See also 
 Jack TV
 Solar Entertainment Corporation

Jack TV
Solar Entertainment Corporation